Richard Gwynn  was a Welsh Anglican priest in the 17th century.

Gwynn was educated at University College, Oxford. He held livings at Trawsfynydd, Llanfwrog and Llantrissaint. Gwynn was Archdeacon of Bangor from 1613 until his death on 9 September 1617.

References

Alumni of University College, Oxford
Archdeacons of Bangor
17th-century Welsh Anglican priests